Dendropsophus pauiniensis is a species of frog in the family Hylidae.
It is found in Brazil and possibly Bolivia.
Its natural habitats are subtropical or tropical moist lowland forests and rivers.

References

pauiniensis
Amphibians described in 1977
Taxonomy articles created by Polbot